Swamp Gas Visits the United States of America is a computer game developed by Inline Design in 1990 for the Macintosh and Windows 3.1x. A sequel - Swamp Gas Visits Europe - was released in 1992.

Swamp Gas Visits Europe is the sequel to the game.

Plot
Swamp Gas Visits the United States of America is an educational game designed to assist students with their knowledge of United States geography, for up to four players.  The main character is an alien that, after departing from his mothership that hovers far above the map, flies his UFO around the U.S. The alien hovers above various states, and is quizzed about the name and capital of each state; entering the correct information allows the player into the Alien Arcade.  The players select missions from a pop-up menu. Sometimes, due to a malfunction from the mothership, the alien will face a Close Encounter that must be dealt with by correctly answering a multiple-choice question regarding the alien's current location.

Reception
The game was reviewed in 1992 in Dragon #178 by Hartley, Patricia, and Kirk Lesser in "The Role of Computers" column. The reviewers gave the game 5 out of 5 stars.

References

1990 video games
Children's educational video games
Classic Mac OS games
Video games developed in the United States
Windows games